New Delhi is a 1988 Hindi-language political thriller film, produced by M. Sudhakar Reddy, M.Tirupathi Reddy on Samyuktha Productions banner and directed by Joshiy. Starring Jeetendra, Sumalatha  and music composed by Shyam. The film is a remake of director's own Malayalam film New Delhi (1987). The story is loosely based on the novel The Almighty by Irving Wallace.  It was the debut movie of Urvashi and Suresh Gopi who reprised their role from the original version. The film recorded as flop at the box office.

Plot
The film begins at New Delhi Central jail where a journalist Vijay Kumar / VK is under conviction for being guiltless. In the prison, he befriends 4 fellow prisoners Vishnu, Ananth, Siddique, & Appu. On the eve of Republic Day, two political bigwigs Deshbandhu Sharma & Shankar visit when they mortify VK because of the rivalry prior and also deny him his chance of setting free. Then, his colleagues seek the reason and he spins back. A few years ago, VK is a courageous journalist who always defies anarchy & depravity. He is acquainted with a classical dancer Maria Fernandes and loves her. Once, Deshbandhu & Shankar deceive and molest her when VK decides to break the reality. Being aware of it, the brutes apprehend him with false allegations. In the court, with the fake alibis, subduing Maria they deem him insane and place him at the asylum. Accordingly, he is subjected to torments and turns into a handicap. Later, they shift him to Central Jail.

Time passes, and VK is released, and with the support of Maria, he sets a newspaper New Delhi Diary accompanying trained journalists his sister Uma, and her beau Suresh. VK frames for avenge by creating nonexistent journalist Viswanath and breaking the prison of his team. At once, they start their murder spree which VK instantly, publishes in his newspaper and that triumph. Within no time, the paper summits as the leading one in India. Suresh & Uma suspect something fishy. Meanwhile, Deshbandhu & Shankar move forward for VK's amity owing to his popularity which he accepts. In tandem, VK's team slaughter Deshbandhu which Suresh witnesses and accumulates pieces of evidence. Hence, VK orders to kill him too. In that process, Siddique & Appu dies. Uma overhears the conversation and revolts on VK when he learns about her love for Suresh and rescues him. Then, Ananth & Vishnu moves to kill Shankar, when they die in the encounter and VK publishes. However, knowing his survival VK is dejected but does not leave the spirit. During that time, Shankar heckles him when Maria eliminates him. Finally, the movie ends with VK & Maria proceeding with their sentence.

Cast
Jeetendra as Vijay 'VK' Kumar
Sumalatha as Maria Fernandes 
Suresh Gopi as Suresh
Urvashi as Uma, Vijay's sister
Raza Murad as Janseva Party's Leader Deshbandhu Sharma  
Thiagarajan as Nataraj Vishnu aka Salem Vishnu
Devan as Shankar
Siddique as Siddique 
Vijayaraghavan as Ananth
Mohan Jose as Johny
Prathapachandran as Maria Fernandes'father

References

External links
 

1988 films
1980s Hindi-language films
Films scored by Shyam (composer)
Indian action films
Hindi remakes of Malayalam films
Films directed by Joshiy
1988 action films